Shafiee is a surname. Notable people with the surname include:

Abbas Shafiee (1937–2016), Iranian pharmaceutical chemist
Masoud Shafiee, Iranian lawyer